Methodist Hospital is the name of numerous medical institutions.

 Indiana University Health Methodist Hospital, Indianapolis, Indiana
 Houston Methodist Hospital, Houston, Texas
 Methodist Dallas Medical Center, Dallas, Texas
 Methodist Hospital (San Antonio), San Antonio, Texas
 Methodist Hospital (Jacksonville), Jacksonville, Florida
 Methodist Hospital (Omaha, Nebraska), Omaha, Nebraska
 Methodist Hospital (Philadelphia), Philadelphia, Pennsylvania
 Methodist Hospital of Sacramento, Sacramento, California
 Methodist University Hospital, Memphis, Tennessee
 New York Methodist Hospital, Brooklyn, New York
 Rochester Methodist Hospital, owned by Mayo Clinic, Rochester, Minnesota

See also 
 List of hospitals in Florida
 List of hospitals in Illinois
 List of hospitals in Indiana
 List of hospitals in Kentucky
 List of hospitals in Minnesota
 List of hospitals in Nebraska
 List of hospitals in Texas